Ergastolo (aka Prison) is a black and white 1952 Italian crime melodrama film directed by Luigi Capuano.

Plot
Rosa Lulli, has an illegitimate 20-year-old son, named Stefano, who lives with her in the house of Professor Arlotta. Stefano is in love with Lydia, the granddaughter of the professor. The couple has a gambling addiction: the need to obtain a large sum to meet gambling debts, which pushes him to accept the loving invitation of Jeannette, owner of a dance school, where Stefano goes to play. But Jeannette is the lover of Pasquale Anitra, head of a criminal gang. When he is killed in Jeannette's home, Stefano is framed and arrested and tried for the murder. Stefano is sentenced to life in prison. Lydia, attending dance school, later hears a conversation in which Jeannette confesses to the murder. She tells the police, but is kidnapped by the criminal gang. During the chase, Jeannette is wounded and before dying, confesses to the authorities. Stefano is freed and marries Lydia.

Cast 
 Franco Interlenghi as Stefano Lulli
 Sandro Ruffini as Avvocato Leonardi
 Marisa Merlini as Jeannette
 Leda Gloria as Francesca — Stefano's mother
 Tina Pica as Mrs. De Giorgi
 Hélène Rémy as Lidia
 Ernesto Almirante as The Professor — Lidia's grandfather
Natale Cirino as Pasquale Amitrano
Guglielmo Barnabò as  Hotel Director 
Bruno Corelli as Gianluigi
Wilma Montesi uncredited

Reception
The film grossed 223,000,000.00 lire at the box office.

References 
www.film.tv.it

External links 
 
Review 

1952 films
1950s Italian-language films
Italian prison films
1952 drama films
Films directed by Luigi Capuano
Melodrama films
Italian drama films
Italian black-and-white films
1950s Italian films